Â, â (a-circumflex) is a letter of the Inari Sami, Skolt Sami, Romanian, and Vietnamese alphabets. This letter also appears in French, Friulian, Frisian, Portuguese, Turkish, Walloon, and Welsh languages as a variant of the letter "a". It is included in some romanization systems for Khmer, Persian, Russian, and Ukrainian.

Berber languages 
"â" can be used in Berber Latin alphabet to represent .

Emilian-Romagnol 
Â is used to represent [aː] in Emilian dialects, as in Bolognese câna [kaːna] "cane".

Faroese 
Johan Henrik Schrøter, who translated the Gospel of Matthew into Faroese in 1823, used â to denote a non-syllabic a, as in the following example:

Â is not used in modern Faroese, however.

French 
, in the French language, is used as the letter  with a circumflex accent. It is a remnant of Old French, where the vowel was followed, with some exceptions, by the consonant . For example, the modern form bâton comes from the Old French baston. However, the traditional  is still pronounced this way in Québecois French or Canadian French, which is known to resemble the phonetics of the Old French accent, and is widely spoken by French Canadians, the majority of whom live in the province of Québec.

In Maghreb French,  is used to transcribe the Arabic consonant  , whose pronunciation is close to a non-syllabic .

Friulian 
Â is used to represent the  sound.

Inari Sami
Â is used to represent the  sound.

Italian 
Â occasionally used to represent the sound  in words like amârono (they loved).

Khmer 
Â is used in the UNGEGN romanization system to represent the  sound in Khmer.

Persian 
Â is used in the romanization of Persian to represent the sound  in words such as Fârs.

Portuguese 
In Portuguese, â is used to mark a stressed  in words whose stressed syllable is nasal and in an unpredictable location within the word, as in "lâmina" (blade) and "âmbar" (amber). Where the location of the stressed syllable is predictable, such as in "ando" (I walk), the circumflex accent is not used. Â  contrasts with á, pronounced .

Romanian 
Â is the 3rd letter of the Romanian alphabet and represents , which is also represented in Romanian as letter î. The difference between the two is that â is used in the middle of the word, as in "România", while î is used at the beginning and at the ends: "înțelegere" (understanding), "a urî" (to hate). A compound word starting with the letter î will retain it, even if it goes in the middle of the word: compare "înțelegere" (understanding) with "neînțelegere" (misunderstanding). However, if a suffix is added, the î changes into â, as in the example: "a urî" (to hate), "urât" (hated).

Russian 
Â is used in the ISO 9:1995 system of Russian transliteration as the letter Я.

Serbo-Croatian 
In all standard varieties of Serbo-Croatian, "â" is not a letter but simply an "a" with the circumflex that denotes vowel length. It is used only occasionally and then disambiguates homographs, which differ only by syllable length. That is most common in the plural genitive case and so it is also called "genitive sign": "Ja sam sâm".

Turkish 
Â is used to indicate the consonant before "a" is palatalized, as in "kâr" (profit). It is also used to indicate  in words for which the long vowel changes the meaning, as in "adet" (pieces) and "âdet" (tradition) / "hala" (aunt) and "hâlâ" (still).

Ukrainian 
Â is used in the ISO 9:1995 system of Ukrainian transliteration to represent the letter Я.

Vietnamese 
In Vietnamese phonology, diacritics can be added to form five forms to represent five tones of â:
 Ầ ầ
 Ẩ ẩ
 Ẫ ẫ
 Ấ ấ
 Ậ ậ

Welsh 
In Welsh, â is used to represent long stressed a  when, without the circumflex, the vowel would be pronounced as short , e.g., âr  "arable", as opposed to ar  "on"; or gwâr  "civilised, humane", rather than gwar  "nape of the neck". It is often found in final syllables where two adjacent a letters combine to produce a long stressed vowel. This commonly happens when a verb stem ending in stressed a combines with the nominalising suffix -ad, as in  + -ad giving   "permission",  and also when a singular noun ending in a receives the plural suffix -au, as in drama + -au becoming dramâu  "dramas, plays". It is also useful in writing borrowed words with final stress, e.g.   "brigade".

A circumflex is also used in the word â, which is both a preposition, meaning "with, by means of, as", and the third person non-past singular of the verbal noun mynd, "go". This distinguishes it in writing from the similarly pronounced a, meaning "and; whether; who, which, that".

Character mappings

Windows Alt Key codes 

Source:

TeX and LaTeX
Â and â are obtained by the commands \^A and \^a.

In encoding mismatches 
The capital Â is sometimes seen on webpages when the page has been saved in an encoding different from that used to view it. The most common text encoding standard is Unicode, which encodes, for example, the copyright symbol © with the hexadecimal bytes C2 A9. In the older ANSI and ISO 8859-1 encoding standards, however, the © symbol is simply A9. If a browser is given the bytes C2 A9, intended to display © per the Unicode standard, but is led to parse the bytes according to one of these older standards, it will interpret the bytes C2 A9 as two separate characters. C2 corresponds to Â, as seen in the chart above, and A9 devolves to the © symbol, so the result seen by the person reading the page is Â©—that is, the correct © symbol but with an Â prepended. A number of characters—the characters in the Latin-1 supplement—have Unicode encodings that are equal to their ANSI encodings but preceded by the byte C2, so that when any of these characters is viewed in the incorrect encoding, an Â will appear before it.

See also
 Circumflex

References

A-circumflex
Romanian language